
Gmina Krupski Młyn is a rural gmina (administrative district) in Tarnowskie Góry County, Silesian Voivodeship, in southern Poland. It also contains the villages of Potępa and Ziętek.

The area is environmentally very impressive, mostly forested (83% of the area), with many oak trees up to 500 years old, dotted with pleasant streams and small lakes.

Neighbouring gminas
Gmina Krupski Młyn is bordered by the town of Lubliniec and by the gminas of Pawonków, Tworóg, Wielowieś and Zawadzkie.

Explosives plant
The major industrial establishment in the area is NITRON S.A., a company specializing in production of explosives. The company has a long history since its establishment in 1874 (then in Germany). There was a notable explosion in the plant in 1918, with numerous fatalities. The reconstructed Kruppamühle der Lignose Sprengstoffwerke GmbH employed 300 in 1929 and 750 in 1944. In 1934, the production was switched over to nitroglycerin and dynamite types of explosives.

Nowadays, the plant essentially consists of a system of bunkers in a forest, with strong walls but light roofs. It produces mostly explosives for applications in mining and civil engineering.

References

Krupski Mlyn
Tarnowskie Góry County